Khvormuj Rural District is in the Central District of Dashti County, Bushehr province, Iran. At the census of 2006, its population was 4,181 in 986 households; there were 4,486 inhabitants in 1,297 households at the following census of 2011; and in the most recent census of 2016, the population of the rural district was 4,549 in 1,454 households. The largest of its 14 villages was Derazi, with 892 people.

References 

Rural Districts of Bushehr Province
Populated places in Dashti County